Tyler Knight (born December 22, 1984) is a professional indoor football linebacker. He played college football at Mississippi Valley State, and currently plays for the Sioux City Bandits.

Early life
Knight prepped at McClellan Magnet High School in Little Rock, Arkansas.

College career
Knight attended Mississippi Valley State University after high school. After his junior season in 2005, Knight was named the Southwestern Athletic Conference (SWAC) Defensive Player of the Year, earning 1st Team All-SWAC honors. Knight was picked as the preseason 2006 SWAC Defensive Player of the Year, but couldn't reclaim the title, but he was still named First Team All-SWAC.

Professional career

Arkansas Diamonds
In 2010, Knight began playing with the Arkansas Diamonds of the Indoor Football League (IFL). Knight helped the Diamonds to an 11-3 regular season record, and a berth in the Intense Conference Finals, where they were defeated 53-42 by the Billings Outlaws.

Sioux Falls Storm
In 2011, Sioux Falls Storm signed Knight. Knight had 104 tackles, leading the IFL, and helping the Storm win the United Bowl.

Kansas City Command
After a great 2011 season, Knight signed with the Kansas City Command of the Arena Football League (AFL). At the conclusion of the 2012 season, the Command folded.

Return to Sioux Falls
Knight returned to Sioux Falls in 2013. Knight lead the Storm to yet another title, and was named the IFL Defensive Player of the Year. In 2016, Knight was named a Second Team All-IFL selection. Knight was named Second Team All-IFL in 2017.

References

1984 births
Living people
Players of American football from Arkansas
American football linebackers
Mississippi Valley State Delta Devils football players
Arkansas Diamonds players
Sioux Falls Storm players
Kansas City Command players
People from North Little Rock, Arkansas
Sportspeople from Little Rock, Arkansas